Oraphasmophaga is a genus of flies in the family Tachinidae.

Species
O. pictipennis (Reinhard, 1935)

References

Exoristinae
Diptera of North America
Tachinidae genera